Is a Fantasy role playing video game released in 2002 for the PlayStation 2 console by Victor Interactive Software, Inc. in Japan. The game involved an innovative concept of a role playing game involving no battles or fighting. Its game play shows some influence from dating simulation games. The game was never released outside Japan.

Victor's official page described the game as a "Heart Warming RPG" The storyline has many humorous sections, as well as plenty of "tear jerker" dramatic scenes. The visual style, music and characters have been widely described as "cute" and the game is arguably aimed at female gamers.

In terms of gameplay, Reveal Fantasia consists mostly of fetch quests and has elements of platform gaming. The game has been criticized for being overly difficult toward the later stages.

References

2002 video games
Video games developed in Japan
Japan-exclusive video games
PlayStation 2 games
Role-playing video games
Victor Interactive Software games